Joel Thomas Nigg is an American clinical psychologist known for his research on attention-deficit/hyperactivity disorder (ADHD). He is Professor of Psychiatry, Pediatrics, and Behavioral Neuroscience at the Oregon Health & Science University (OHSU), where he is also director of the Division of Psychology and of the ADHD program.

Nigg grew up in Dubuque, Iowa. He was educated at Harvard University, from which he received his A.B. in religion and psychology in 1980. After receiving his Master of Social Work degree from the University of Michigan, he developed a growing interest in mental disorders in children. He went on to receive his Ph.D. from the University of California, Berkeley in 1996. He joined the faculty of OHSU in 2008.

References

External links

Faculty page

Oregon Health & Science University faculty
Attention deficit hyperactivity disorder researchers
Living people
Harvard University alumni
University of California, Berkeley alumni
University of Michigan School of Social Work alumni
Fellows of the Association for Psychological Science
Scientists from Iowa
Year of birth missing (living people)
American child psychologists
American clinical psychologists